The list of ship launches in 1739 includes a chronological list of some ships launched in 1739.


References

1739
Ship launches